Lucius Papirius Crassus may refer to:

 Lucius Papirius Crassus (consul 436 BC)
 Lucius Papirius Crassus (consul 336 BC)

See also